Vikebygd is a village in Vindafjord municipality in Rogaland county, Norway. The village is located along the Ålfjorden, about  straight west of the village of Ølensvåg. The village was the administrative centre of the former municipality of Vikebygd which existed from 1902 until 1964. Vikebygd is the site of Vikebygd Church.

Media gallery

References

Villages in Rogaland
Vindafjord